Jonta Woodard (born July 22, 1978) is an American-born former Canadian football offensive tackle in the Canadian Football League. Woodard has played for the Hamilton Tiger-Cats and the Toronto Argonauts.  He also played for the Louisville Fire of the af2 as an undrafted free agent in 2003.

Woodard played college football at Louisville.

External links
Toronto Argonauts bio
Just Sports Stats

1978 births
Living people
Players of Canadian football from Stockton, California
American players of Canadian football
Canadian football offensive linemen
Louisville Cardinals football players
Louisville Fire players
Hamilton Tiger-Cats players
Toronto Argonauts players
Players of American football from Stockton, California